Rattachism ("reattach-ism") or Reunionism (Réunionisme) is a political ideology which calls for the French-speaking part of Belgium or Wallonia to secede from Belgium and become part of France. Brussels, which is majority French-speaking but enclaved in Flanders, may be included within this ideology as may the six Flemish municipalities with language facilities for French-speakers around Brussels. It can be considered a French-speaking equivalent of Grootneerlandisme (or, historically, Orangism) in Flanders.

The Rattachist ideology is associated with a faction of the Walloon Movement and is advocated by the political parties Walloon Rally and Wallonia–France Rally. Neither presently have any parliamentary seats.

History and etymology
The "r" in "rattachism" (from "re-" and "attach"), indicating a re-unification, is in reference to a future unification being a repeat occurrence, after the previous "unity" which transpired during the "French period" (1794–1815).

Present-day Belgium was conquered in 1795 by the French Republic during the French Revolutionary Wars. It was annexed to the Republic, which later became the Napoleonic Empire. After the Battle of Waterloo (1815), Wallonia became part of the Kingdom of the Netherlands under King William of Orange. Following the 1830 Belgian Revolution, Wallonia became a part of the Kingdom of Belgium.

Following the Belgian Revolution a minority of Walloons called for unification with France. Four newspapers that supported unification were Le Journal de Verviers, Le Journal de la province de Liège, L'Industrie and L'Éclaireur. At this time Rattachists in Verviers were a majority. Rattachists argued that in order to preserve their economic prosperity they must unite with France and that culturally the place was French. The Regent of Belgium, Erasme Louis Surlet de Chokier was a supporter in this period, as was Charles de Brouckère, Charles Rogier and Alexandre Gendebien. After the German Prince Leopold I became King of Belgium in 1831 the Rattachists hopes of unification disappeared.

In 1968, President of France and World War II hero Charles de Gaulle stated that "If one day a political authority representative of Wallonia were to approach France officially, that day we would respond favourably, with full hearts, to a request that appeared legitimate".

Current support

In France
A 2008 poll published by French newspaper La Voix du Nord found about 60% of French respondents support unification with Wallonia. A November 2007 poll found support at 54% among respondents.

A 2010 Institut français d'opinion publique (IFOP) poll found that if the Belgian political crisis led to the splitting up of Belgium, 66% of the French respondents would support the unification of Wallonia with France. IFOP has stated support for unification with France had been rising since 2007.

French politicians Jean-Pierre Chevènement, Nicolas Dupont-Aignan, Jacques Myard, Marine Le Pen, Jean-Luc Mélenchon and Éric Zemmour have all voiced support for Rattachism. Economist Jacques Attali also supports it.

In Wallonia 
Another poll taken in 2010 during the Belgian political crisis also conducted by IFOP found that 32% of Walloons surveyed would support unification if Belgium splits up.

See also 
 Greater Netherlands
Pan-Netherlands
 Irredentism
 Natural borders of France
 Revanchism

References 

 
French irredentism
Pan-nationalism
Political ideologies
Separatism in Belgium
Walloon movement